The International Search and Rescue Dog Organisation (IRO) is the worldwide umbrella organisation for search and rescue dog work and partner of the UNO. It unites more than 250,000 people worldwide with about 2,000 certified search and rescue (SAR) dogs. The headquarters are in Salzburg.

The task of the International Search and Rescue Dog Organisation is to train and certify highly qualified search and rescue dog teams and to provide them as supporting units in case of emergency. Thanks to their fine noses, dogs often become lifesavers after an avalanche accident, an earthquake or in the search for missing children and disoriented people suffering from Alzheimer's or Dementia. The more than 120 member organisations of the International Search and Rescue Dog Organisation are on 24-hour standby, 365 days a year to help people in need.

The International Search and Rescue Dog Organisation was founded in 1993 and is a registered non-profit organisation. As such, it relies upon donations to provide search and rescue dog teams with the certification, training and education necessary to find lost and missing people.

Competence 

With their extremely fine sense of smell, dogs are indispensable in search operations, because in contrast to humans, dogs have about 40 times the number of olfactory cells. Therefore, search and rescue dogs can locate the position of buried or missing persons with great accuracy. Despite the rapid technical development, search and rescue dogs are still far superior to any search technology. The four-legged lifesavers are particularly characterised by their flexibility, agility on difficult terrain and incredible search drive.

Training 

The training of search and rescue dogs often starts at the age of eight weeks. Courses, trainings and testing events prepare the four-legged friends step by step for the case of emergency. IRO trains search and rescue dogs in the disciplines of tracking, area, avalanche, rubble and water search as well as mantrailing. The first test (V-test) evaluates among other things dexterity and nerve strength.
Thereupon the search and rescue dog teams can take the A- and B-tests.

Facts & figures
 Average training period: 2 – 3 years
 Number of IRO tested search and rescue dogs: over 2,000
 Number of trained IRO rescuers since 1993: ~ 35,000
 Amount of money required for training a search and rescue dog: 20,000 Euros
 National missions per year: approx. 2,000

Deployment 

A positive B test allows for a participation at the MRT (Mission Readiness Test). Annually, the IRO hosts at least one MRT in the discipline Area Search as well as Rubble Search. Teams with a positive result are therefore very well prepared for a disaster mission. The establishment of national search and rescue dog capacities, especially in disaster-prone countries, is essential for the IRO. At the same time, international cooperation is becoming increasingly important, in order to coordinate search and rescue dog teams efficiently when major disasters occur.

Missions of IRO search and rescue dogs

The more than 120 member organisations of the IRO are available at any time of the day, 365 days a year. Below three missions with participation of IRO search and rescue dog teams.

Hotel collapse after earthquake jn Taiwan

On 6 February 2018 a fatal earthquake with a magnitude of 6.4 hit eastern Taiwan. Due to the incident many buildings collapsed and many people were trapped in dangerous situations. Most of them were rescued by civilians and local fire service within a few hours. It was reported that particularly in two buildings, the Marshall Hotel and the apartment complex Yun Men Tsui Ti, some people were still missing. 20 search and rescue dog teams from the IRO member organisations TSSRT and TFSRD were deployed. Five of them just got their IRO-MRT-certificates. The difficult search paid off and all missing persons in the Marshall Hotel could be rescued. The Yun Men Tsui Ti building tilted almost 30 degrees and represented a major challenge. Small spaces, plenty of furniture, wires and pipes made the search particularly difficult.

Missing boy from Stopice

On 9 May 2018 a message was received, which stated that a 13-year-old boy of the small village Stopice went missing. Dog handlers of the IRO member organisation ERPS were immediately called in and started their search after a short briefing at the deployment site and the lay out of the search strategy. Six search and rescue dog teams of the discipline Area and one Mantrailing team were deployed. Only after 25 minutes searching, the boy could be located by a search dog behind a chapel. Subsequently, the parents were informed and the boy was brought home safely.

Severe earthquake in Mexico City and surroundings

Exactly on the same day as the remembrance of the earthquake of 1985 took place, the earth shook again. On 19 September 2017 at 13:14 local time the shaking started. The IRO member organisation PMPBR-UNAM searched nine different buildings, among them a school, with their search and rescue dogs. Altogether, 35 to 40 buildings were searched by rescue teams. Since it has been an earthquake of a greater extent, Canadian and Argentine IRO teams were called in towards the end of the mission too.

Member organisations 
Since its foundation in 1993, the number of member organisations of the IRO has grown steadily. At present, 123 national rescue dog organisations are active in 42 countries worldwide. In Austria alone there are ten organisations.

Events 
IRO organises courses, trainings, International Testing Events, mission readiness tests, competitions and the annual World Championship for search and rescue dogs. Up to 150 SAR dog teams take up the challenge of tracking, area and rubble search at the World Championship. 2018 also saw the first World Championship in the discipline of avalanche search. Much effort is put into recreating real-life scenarios, which the best of the best impressively master.

In 2008, the IRO also launched the International Search and Rescue Dog Day, an initiative that offers search and rescue dog organisations the opportunity to present themselves and at the same time give an insight into the valuable work with search and rescue dogs. According to the motto "365 days a year mission ready", demonstrations, information events and trial trainings are organised all over the world.

Organisational structure 
The International Search and Rescue Dog Organisation is based in Salzburg, Austria and currently employs seven people. The highest decision-making body of the IRO is the Meeting of Delegates. It is composed of the delegates from the respective national search and rescue dog organisations, the executive board and the executive committee.

History 
The Spitak earthquake in Armenia in 1988 raised the question of international cooperation in the field of search and rescue dog training. As one of the most severe earthquakes in recent decades, it gave the impulse to strive for better coordination between disaster relief workers, search and rescue dog teams and authorities. As a result, the IRO was founded in 1993 with the aim of setting standards for the training and deployment of search and rescue dog teams worldwide. Since the beginning, the IRO has been working together with the UN to continuously develop and improve SAR dog work.

References

External links 
 Website of the International Search and Rescue Dog Organisation
 Website of the IRO World Championship for Search and Rescue Dogs
 Website of the International Search and Rescue Dog Day

International organisations based in Austria
Organisations based in Salzburg
Dog organizations
Missing people organizations
Search and rescue dogs